Sonseed was an American Catholic pop band formed at the Church of Our Lady of Perpetual Help in Brooklyn, New York in the late 1970s. The line-up included Sal Polichetti (bass, vocals); his then-wife Patricia Costagliola (keyboards, vocals; deceased); Frank Franco (guitar, vocals); and Nicky Sciarra (deceased, drums). Anne Lessing (vocals) was also involved in the band from the start. There were others including Jim Archer (vocals) and Karen Archer (acoustic guitar), Tom Zawacki (tambourine, percussion and vocals), Brother John Weiners, CSC (deceased, vocals), and Melody Sorrentino (vocals). Their sole album, First Fruit, was released in 1981, with only 1,000 copies printed. In 2009 Sonseed released an EP on Arena Rock Records which includes selections from the original First Fruit album.  A proposed follow-up, Just Can't Get Enough (Of Jesus!!!), with more new wave and New Romantic elements, never saw official release, but some bootleg tracks have surfaced. Sonseed disbanded in 1983.

As Patricia Costa, Costagliola recorded two albums, Walk Forward and Give Your Love Away, with Polichetti, Franco and Sciarra as the backing band.

Nicky Sciarra became district manager of Community Board 7 in Sunset Park, Brooklyn. He died in 1993 after apparently choking on a sandwich.

The band came back into the spotlight in 2008 when a recording of them performing their song "Jesus Is a Friend of Mine", from a religious TV show called The First Estate, appeared on the Dougsploitation blog, and subsequently became a YouTube hit, where it spawned several parodies. Polichetti performed the song live at the Bowery Poetry Club in New York City on November 14, 2009 with the ska-swing band Tri-State Conspiracy.

In 2011, Fox Television's hit show Glee also did a cover of the song "Jesus Is a Friend of Mine". During the Regional competition, the group "Aural Intensity" sang the song.

References

External links
 Copyright info for First Fruit.
 - Library of Congress entry for "sonseed".
Sonseed on Arena Rock Recording Company

American Christian rock groups
Musical groups established in the 1970s
Musical groups from Brooklyn
Catholic musical groups
Viral videos
Internet memes introduced in the 2000s